Michael James Delligatti (August 2, 1918 – November 28, 2016) was an American entrepreneur. He was an early franchisee of the fast food restaurant chain McDonald's, opening the first of his eventual 48 branches in Uniontown, Pennsylvania, in 1957. Delligatti is also credited as the creator of McDonald's "Big Mac" hamburger in 1967.

Early life 
Michael James Delligatti was born in Uniontown, Pennsylvania, on August 2, 1918, the son of James Delligatti, a farrier, cobbler and candy maker, and his wife, Lucille Dandrea. He was educated there and at Fairmont Senior High School in Fairmont, West Virginia, before serving in Europe during World War II with the United States Army, where he was discharged after suffering from trench foot.

Career 

After the war, Delligatti owned a drive-through restaurant in Newport Beach, California and, after meeting Ray Kroc at a restaurant fair in 1955, Delligatti started as a McDonald's franchisee in 1957.

Delligatti thought up the concept for the Big Mac in 1965 in the kitchen of his first McDonald's franchise, located on McKnight Road in suburban Ross Township and started serving it at his Uniontown McDonald's in April 1967 for 45 cents. By 1968, the Big Mac was on the menu of every American McDonald's, and in 1969, it accounted for 19% of total sales. According to a 1970s jingle the burger contains: "two all-beef patties, special sauce, lettuce, cheese, pickles, onions on a sesame-seed bun."

Interviewed by the Los Angeles Times in 1993, Delligatti agreed that he was not the inventor of the double-decker burger: "This wasn't like discovering the lightbulb. The bulb was already there. All I did was screw it in the socket." In an interview with a Pittsburgh television station, Delligatti said that he had received no royalty payments for the creation of the Big Mac, but had received a plaque. According to his son Michael, Jim ate a Big Mac every week.

As of 2016, McDonald's sells about 550 million Big Macs in the U.S. every year.

Personal life and death 
Delligatti was married twice, with his first marriage to Ann Vunora ending in divorce. They had one son. He and his second wife, Eleanor "Ellie" Carmody, had one son, five grandchildren, and eight great-grandchildren.  He died on November 28, 2016, at his home in Fox Chapel, Pennsylvania, at age 98.

References 

1918 births
2016 deaths
McDonald's people
Businesspeople from Pennsylvania
People from Uniontown, Pennsylvania
People from Fox Chapel, Pennsylvania
United States Army personnel of World War II
Fairmont Senior High School alumni
20th-century American businesspeople
Businesspeople from Fairmont, West Virginia